Sekyi Quaye (born 16 June 1990) is a Ghanaian professional footballer who last played as a defender or midfielder for Lebanese club Egtmaaey Tripoli.

Early life
Quaye was born and raised in Tema, Greater Accra in Ghana. He began his football career for Tema Youth. He played his coast football for Phitizo FC, a colt juvenile team located in Ghana.

Club career
Quaye has played for Tema Youth, where he scored five goals in all competitions, before moving to New Edubiase United. After successful seasons with the club, he later joined Ghanaian Division One League club Tudu Mighty Jets.

In 2014, Quaye moved to Latvia to sign a three-year contract with first league outfit FC Jūrmala.

On 8 September 2016, Quaye moved to Lebanon to sign a one-year deal with Egtmaaey Tripoli, where he played as a midfielder. He moved to the top flight club in 2016. In his debut match with the Lebanon outfit, he inspired Egtmaaey to a 3–2 win over Shabab Sahel by providing two first-half assists.

International career
Quaye made his official debut for Ghana U20 in 2014.

References

External links

 
 

1990 births
Living people
Ghanaian footballers
Association football defenders
Association football midfielders
Expatriate footballers in Lebanon
Lebanese Premier League players
Ghanaian expatriate footballers
Ghanaian expatriate sportspeople in Lebanon
Al Egtmaaey SC players
New Edubiase United F.C. players